Jean Alix Holmand is a Haitian judoka. He competed in the men's half-middleweight event at the 1992 Summer Olympics.

References

Year of birth missing (living people)
Living people
Haitian male judoka
Olympic judoka of Haiti
Judoka at the 1992 Summer Olympics
Place of birth missing (living people)